The 2015–16 Minnesota Timberwolves season was the 27th season of the franchise in the National Basketball Association (NBA). Before the season, the Timberwolves announced that head coach and team president Flip Saunders will not coach the team this season as he continued his battle with cancer. Sam Mitchell was named interim head coach. On October 25, 2015, Saunders died and the Wolves announced that Mitchell as the interim coach for the rest of the season. Around the start of the season, the Timberwolves were the first team in NBA history with four players that were around 20 or younger, between Andrew Wiggins, Zach LaVine, Karl-Anthony Towns, and Tyus Jones to start out a season.

It also marked the final season of Kevin Garnett's career in the NBA and his first time since 2006-07 playing with the Timberwolves. Playing 21 years in the league, Garnett previously played for the Wolves from 1995 to 2007 until being traded to the Boston Celtics, where he won a championship with them in 2008. Prior to his second stint with the Wolves, Garnett played two disappointing seasons with the Brooklyn Nets, one of them with fellow Celtics Paul Pierce and Jason Terry. Garnett is believed by many as the greatest Timberwolf of all time. He was also the last remaining active player from the 1995 NBA Draft.

The Timberwolves missed the playoffs for the 12th consecutive season, equalling the second-longest postseason appearance drought in NBA history of the Golden State Warriors between 1994–95 and 2005–06, only behind the Los Angeles Clippers between 1976–77 and 1990–91. However, the Timberwolves had their second straight Rookie of the Year winner with #1 pick Karl-Anthony Towns earning the award.

Draft

Roster

Pre-season

|- style="background:#fbb;"
| 1
| October 7
| Oklahoma City
| 99–122
| Dieng, Towns (18)
| Bjelica, Towns (5)
| Tyus Jones (4)
| Staples Center8,601
| 0–1
|- style="background-color:#fbb;"
| 2
| October 10
| Chicago
| 105–114
| Tyus Jones (18)
| Karl-Anthony Towns (10)
| Tyus Jones (9)
| MTS Centre15,294
| 0–2
|- style="background:#fbb;"
| 3
| October 12
| @ Toronto
| 105–112
| Andrew Wiggins (21)
| Dieng, Payne, Towns (6)
| Lorenzo Brown (5)
| Air Canada Centre19,277
| 0–3
|- style="background:#bfb;"
| 4
| October 14
| Toronto
| 89–87
| Gorgui Dieng (14)
| Nemanja Bjelica (6)
| Zach LaVine (5)
| Canadian Tire Centre15,522
| 1–3
|- style="background:#fbb;"
| 5
| October 18
| @ Memphis
| 68–90
| Zach LaVine (12)
| Dieng, Towns (7)
| Ricky Rubio (4)
| FedExForum13,387
| 1–4
|- style="background:#fbb;"
| 6
| October 20
| @ Milwaukee
| 88–106
| Shabazz Muhammad (18)
| Nemanja Bjelica (7)
| Garnett, Muhammad, Martin (4)
| Kohl Center12,381
| 1–5
|- style="background:#bfb;"
| 7
| October 23
| Milwaukee
| 112–108
| Andrew Wiggins (24)
| Karl-Anthony Towns (12)
| Ricky Rubio (6)
| Target Center10,101
| 2–5

Regular season

Standings

Conference

Division

Regular season game log

|- style="background:#bfb;"
| 1
| October 28
| @ L. A. Lakers
| 
| Ricky Rubio (28)
| Karl-Anthony Towns (12)
| Ricky Rubio (14)
| Staples Center18,997
| 1–0
|-style="background:#bfb;"
| 2
| October 30
| @ Denver
| 
| Karl-Anthony Towns (28)
| Karl-Anthony Towns (14)
| Ricky Rubio (8)
| Pepsi Center17,660
| 2–0

|-style="background:#fbb;"
| 3
| November 2
| Portland
| 
| Kevin Martin (24)
| Bjelica, Rubio (9)
| Ricky Rubio (9)
| Target Center18,903
| 2–1
|-style="background:#fbb;"
| 4
| November 5
| Miami
| 
| Martin, Muhammad (14)
| Nemanja Bjelica (7)
| Ricky Rubio (5)
| Target Center11,794
| 2–2
|-style="background:#bfb;"
| 5
| November 7
| @ Chicago
| 
| Andrew Wiggins (31)
| Karl-Anthony Towns (13)
| Ricky Rubio (10)
| United Center21,988
| 3–2
|-style="background:#bfb;"
| 6
| November 9
| @ Atlanta
| 
| Andrew Wiggins (33)
| Karl-Anthony Towns (12)
| Ricky Rubio (8)
| Philips Arena12,016
| 4–2
|-style="background:#fbb;"
| 7
| November 10
| Charlotte
| 
| Zach LaVine (20)
| Karl-Anthony Towns (13)
| Zach LaVine (8)
| Target Center14,722
| 4–3
|- style="background:#fbb;"
| 8
| November 12
| Golden State
| 
| Andrew Wiggins (19)
| Karl-Anthony Towns (11)
| Kevin Martin (6)
| Target Center16,130
| 4–4
|- style="background:#fbb;"
| 9
| November 13
| @ Indiana
| 
| LaVine, Wiggins (26)
| Karl-Anthony Towns (9)
| Andre Miller (5)
| Bankers Life Fieldhouse16,797
| 4–5
|- style="background:#fbb;"
| 10
| November 15
| Memphis
| 
| Zach LaVine (25)
| Karl-Anthony Towns (9)
| Andre Miller (8)
| Target Center12,086
| 4–6
|- style="background:#bfb;"
| 11
| November 17
| @ Miami
| 
| Andrew Wiggins (24)
| Karl-Anthony Towns (14)
| LaVine, Rubio (3)
| American Airlines Arena19,600
| 5–6
|- style="background:#fbb;"
| 12
| November 18
| @ Orlando
| 
| Andrew Wiggins (28)
| Ricky Rubio (12)
| Ricky Rubio (12)
| Amway Center16,048
| 5–7
|- style="background:#fbb;"
| 13
| November 20
| Detroit
| 
| Andrew Wiggins (21)
| Martin, Towns (7)
| Ricky Rubio (7)
| Target Center13,445
| 5–8
|- style="background:#bfb;"
| 14
| November 23
| Philadelphia
| 
| Andrew Wiggins (30)
| Kevin Garnett (10)
| Ricky Rubio (11)
| Target Center11,382
| 6–8
|- style="background:#bfb;"
| 15
| November 25
| Atlanta
| 
| Zach LaVine (18)
| Gorgui Dieng (11)
| Rubio, LaVine (6)
| Target Center14,289
| 7–8
|- style="background:#bfb;"
| 16
| November 27
| @ Sacramento
| 
| Andrew Wiggins (22)
| Dieng, LaVine, Towns (8)
| Garnett, LaVine, Miller (4)
| Sleep Train Arena17,317
| 8–8
|- style="background:#fbb;"
| 17
| November 29
| @ L. A. Clippers
| 
| Andrew Wiggins (21)
| Gorgui Dieng (10)
| Zach LaVine (7)
| STAPLES Center19,060
| 8–9

|- style="background:#fbb;"
| 18
| December 1
| Orlando
| 
| Andrew Wiggins (27)
| Bjelica, Garnett (8)
| Zach LaVine (5)
| Target Center10,694
| 8–10
|-style="background:#fbb;"
| 19
| December 5
| Portland
| 
| Karl-Anthony Towns (27)
| Karl-Anthony Towns (12)
| Ricky Rubio (15)
| Target Center16,203
| 8–11
|-style="background:#fbb;"
| 20
| December 7
| L. A. Clippers
| 
| Zach LaVine (21)
| Shabazz Muhammad (9)
| Ricky Rubio (7)
| Target Center11,467
| 8–12
|-style="background:#bfb;"
| 21
| December 9
| L. A. Lakers
| 
| Kevin Martin (37)
| Karl-Anthony Towns (14)
| Ricky Rubio (12)
| Target Center18,076
| 9–12
|-style="background:#fbb;"
| 22
| December 11
| @ Denver
| 
| Martin, Wiggins (22)
| Karl-Anthony Towns (9)
| Ricky Rubio (7)
| Pepsi Center12,533
| 9–13
|- style="background:#fbb;"
| 23
| December 13
| @ Phoenix
| 
| Zach LaVine (28)
| Bjelica, Towns (6)
| Ricky Rubio (7)
| Talking Stick Resort Arena16,919
| 9–14
|-style="background:#fbb;"
| 24
| December 15
| Denver
| 
| Andrew Wiggins (23)
| Gorgui Dieng (9)
| Ricky Rubio (9)
| Target Center11,323
| 9–15
|-style="background:#fbb;"
| 25
| December 16
| @ New York
| 
| Karl-Anthony Towns (25)
| Dieng, Rubio, Towns (10)
| Ricky Rubio (12)
| Madison Square Garden19,812
| 9–16
|- style="background:#bfb;"
| 26
| December 18
| Sacramento
| 
| Andrew Wiggins (32)
| Gorgui Dieng (11)
| Ricky Rubio (8)
| Target Center12,770
| 10–16
|-style="background:#bfb;"
| 27
| December 20
| @ Brooklyn
| 
| Karl-Anthony Towns (24)
| Karl-Anthony Towns (10)
| Ricky Rubio (12)
| Barclays Center14,552
| 11–16
|- style="background:#fbb;"
| 28
| December 21
| @ Boston
| 
| Andrew Wiggins (26)
| Karl-Anthony Towns (16)
| Ricky Rubio (8)
| TD Garden18,624
| 11–17
|- style="background:#fbb;"
| 29
| December 23
| San Antonio
| 
| Zach LaVine (17)
| Karl-Anthony Towns (11)
| LaVine, Rubio (4)
| Target Center16,788
| 11–18
|- style="background:#fbb;"
| 30
| December 26
| Indiana
| 
| Karl-Anthony Towns (24)
| Karl-Anthony Towns (8)
| Ricky Rubio (9)
| Target Center15,076
| 11–19
|- style="background:#fbb;"
| 31
| December 28
| @ San Antonio
| 
| Andrew Wiggins (18)
| Karl-Anthony Towns (12)
| Ricky Rubio (14)
| AT&T Center18,493
| 11–20
|- style="background:#bfb;"
| 32
| December 30
| Utah
| 
| Karl-Anthony Towns (25)
| Karl-Anthony Towns (10)
| Ricky Rubio (17)
| Target Center14,326
| 12–20
|- style="background:#fbb;"
| 33
| December 31
| @ Detroit
| 
| Karl-Anthony Towns (22)
| Karl-Anthony Towns (9)
| Ricky Rubio (8)
| Palace of Auburn Hills15,475
| 12–21

|- style="background:#fbb;"
| 34
| January 2
| Milwaukee
| 
| Andrew Wiggins (19)
| Karl-Anthony Towns (10)
| Ricky Rubio (7)
| Target Center14,107
| 12–22
|- style="background:#fbb;"
| 35
| January 4
| @ Philadelphia
| 
| Shabazz Muhammad (20)
| Gorgui Dieng (8)
| Ricky Rubio (10)
| Wells Fargo Center14,013
| 12–23
|- style="background:#fbb;"
| 36
| January 6
| Denver
| 
| Karl-Anthony Towns (14)
| Karl-Anthony Towns (14)
| Ricky Rubio (7)
| Target Center12,059
| 12–24
|- style="background:#fbb;"
| 37
| January 8
| Cleveland
| 
| Andrew Wiggins (35)
| Dieng, Towns (6)
| Ricky Rubio (6)
| Target Center16,768
| 12–25
|- style="background:#fbb;"
| 38
| January 10
| Dallas
| 
| Andrew Wiggins (21)
| Dieng, Rubio, Wiggins (6)
| Ricky Rubio (8)
| Target Center14,363
| 12–26
|- style="background:#fbb;"
| 39
| January 12
| Oklahoma City
| 
| Andrew Wiggins (22)
| Karl-Anthony Towns (10)
| Ricky Rubio (6)
| Target Center14,791
| 12–27
|- style="background:#fbb;"
| 40
| January 13
| @ Houston
| 
| Andrew Wiggins (28)
| Karl-Anthony Towns (16)
| Ricky Rubio (12)
| Toyota Center17,115
| 12–28
|- style="background:#fbb;"
| 41
| January 15
| @ Oklahoma City
| 
| Andrew Wiggins (25)
| Karl-Anthony Towns (12)
| Nemanja Bjelica (4)
| Chesapeake Energy Arena18,203
| 12–29
|- style="background:#bfb;"
| 42
| January 17
| Phoenix
| 
| Rubio, Wiggins (18)
| Muhammad, Towns (8)
| Andrew Wiggins (4)
| Target Center14,330
| 13–29
|- style="background:#fbb;"
| 43
| January 19
| @ New Orleans
| 
| Andrew Wiggins (25)
| Karl-Anthony Towns (13)
| LaVine, Rubio (4)
| Smoothie King Center14,255
| 13–30
|-style="background:#fbb;"
| 44
| January 20
| @ Dallas
| 
| Karl-Anthony Towns (27)
| Karl-Anthony Towns (17)
| Ricky Rubio (11)
| American Airlines Center19,621
| 13–31
|- style="background:#bfb;"
| 45
| January 23
| Memphis
| 
| Shabazz Muhammad (25)
| Karl-Anthony Towns (9)
| Ricky Rubio (12)
| Target Center15,608
| 14–31
|- style="background:#fbb;"
| 46
| January 25
| @ Cleveland
| 
| Karl-Anthony Towns (26)
| Karl-Anthony Towns (11)
| Ricky Rubio (10)
| Quicken Loans Arena20,562
| 14–32
|- style="background:#fbb;"
| 47
| January 27
| Oklahoma City
| 
| Zach LaVine (35)
| Karl-Anthony Towns (13)
| Ricky Rubio (10)
| Target Center13,337
| 14–33
|- style="background:#fbb;"
| 48
| January 29
| @ Utah
| 
| Karl-Anthony Towns (32)
| Gorgui Dieng (15)
| Ricky Rubio (8)
| Vivint Smart Home Arena18,850
| 14–34
|- style="background:#fbb;"
| 49
| January 31
| @ Portland
| 
| Karl-Anthony Towns (21)
| Karl-Anthony Towns (13)
| Ricky Rubio (9)
| Moda Center19,393
| 14–35

|- style="background:#fbb;"
| 50
| February 2
| @ L. A. Lakers
| 
| Andrew Wiggins (30)
| Karl-Anthony Towns (9)
| Ricky Rubio (15)
| Staples Center18,997
| 14–36
|- style="background:#bfb;"
| 51
| February 3
| @ L. A. Clippers
| 
| Andrew Wiggins (31)
| Karl-Anthony Towns (12)
| Ricky Rubio (7)
| Staples Center19,060
| 15–36
|- style="background:#bfb;"
| 52
| February 6
| Chicago
| 
| Karl-Anthony Towns (26)
| Karl-Anthony Towns (17)
| Gorgui Dieng (7)
| Target Center17,876
| 16–36
|- style="background:#fbb;"
| 53
| February 8
| New Orleans
| 
| Karl-Anthony Towns (17)
| Dieng, Towns (12)
| Ricky Rubio (7)
| Target Center11,926
| 16–37
|- style="background:#bfb;"
| 54
| February 10
| Toronto
| 
| Karl-Anthony Towns (35)
| Karl-Anthony Towns (11)
| Ricky Rubio (8)
| Target Center11,171
| 17–37
|- align="center"
|colspan="9" bgcolor="#bbcaff"|All-Star Break
|- style="background:#fbb;"
| 55
| February 19
| @ Memphis
| 
| Zach LaVine (22)
| Karl-Anthony Towns (15)
| Ricky Rubio (9)
| FedExForum18,119
| 17–38
|- style="background:#fbb;"
| 56
| February 20
| New York
| 
| Karl-Anthony Towns (24)
| Karl-Anthony Towns (8)
| Ricky Rubio (16)
| Target Center16,663
| 17–39
|- style="background:#bfb;"
| 57
| February 22
| Boston
| 
| Karl-Anthony Towns (28)
| Karl-Anthony Towns (13)
| Ricky Rubio (8)
| Target Center11,639
| 18–39
|- style="background:#fbb;"
| 58
| February 24
| @ Toronto
| 
| Andrew Wiggins (26)
| Karl-Anthony Towns (8)
| Ricky Rubio (12) 
| Air Canada Centre19,800
| 18–40
|- style="background:#bfb;"
| 59
| February 27
| @ New Orleans
| 
| Karl-Anthony Towns (30)
| Karl-Anthony Towns (15)
| Ricky Rubio (10)
| Smoothie King Center17,338
| 19–40
|- style="background:#fbb;"
| 60
| February 28
| @ Dallas
| 
| Shabazz Muhammad (24)
| Karl-Anthony Towns (11)
| Tyus Jones (6)
| American Airlines Center20,289
| 19–41

|- style="background:#fbb;"
| 61
| March 2
| Washington
| 
| Ricky Rubio (22)
| Karl-Anthony Towns (15)
| Dieng, Towns (5)
| Target Center11,307
| 19–42
|- style="background:#fbb;"
| 62
| March 4
| @ Milwaukee
| 
| Karl-Anthony Towns (21)
| Gorgui Dieng (9)
| Ricky Rubio (7)
| BMO Harris Bradley Center16,366
| 19–43
|- style="background:#bfb;"
| 63
| March 5
| Brooklyn
| 
| Karl-Anthony Towns (28)
| Ricky Rubio (7)
| Ricky Rubio (10)
| Target Center15,987
| 20–43
|- style="background:#fbb;"
| 64
| March 7
| @ Charlotte
| 
| Karl-Anthony Towns (28)
| Karl-Anthony Towns (14)
| Ricky Rubio (10)
| Time Warner Cable Arena15,912
| 20–44
|- style="background:#fbb;"
| 65
| March 8
| San Antonio
| 
| Andrew Wiggins (23)
| Karl-Anthony Towns (9)
| Tyus Jones (6)
| Target Center14,093
| 20–45
|- style="background:#bfb;"
| 66
| March 11
| @ Oklahoma City
| 
| Gorgui Dieng (25)
| Karl-Anthony Towns (12)
| Ricky Rubio (12)
| Chesapeake Energy Arena18,203
| 21–45
|- style="background:#fbb;"
| 67
| March 14
| @ Phoenix
| 
| Zach LaVine (28)
| Karl-Anthony Towns (10)
| Ricky Rubio (17)
| Talking Stick Resort Arena17,480
| 21–46
|- style="background:#bfb;"
| 68
| March 16
| @ Memphis
| 
| Zach LaVine (28)
| Karl-Anthony Towns (11)
| Ricky Rubio (10)
| FedExForum16,588
| 22–46
|- style="background:#fbb;"
| 69
| March 18
| @ Houston
| 
| Karl-Anthony Towns (32)
| Karl-Anthony Towns (11)
| Ricky Rubio (6)
| Toyota Center18,142
| 22–47
|- style="background:#fbb;"
| 70
| March 21
| Golden State
| 
| Andrew Wiggins (25)
| Karl-Anthony Towns (11)
| Ricky Rubio (11)
| Target Center19,452
| 22–48
|- style="background:#bfb;"
| 71
| March 23
| Sacramento
| 
| Karl-Anthony Towns (26)
| Gorgui Dieng (12)
| Ricky Rubio (12)
| Target Center12,151
| 23–48
|- style="background:#bfb;"
| 72
| March 25
| @ Washington
| 
| Karl-Anthony Towns (27)
| Karl-Anthony Towns (10)
| Ricky Rubio (7)
| Verizon Center20,356
| 24–48
|- style="background:#fbb;"
| 73
| March 26
| Utah
| 
| Ricky Rubio (23)
| Karl-Anthony Towns (11)
| Ricky Rubio (6)
| Target Center14,694
| 24–49
|- style="background:#bfb;"
| 74
| March 28
| Phoenix
| 
| Andrew Wiggins (32)
| Karl-Anthony Towns (10)
| Ricky Rubio (11)
| Target Center11,141
| 25–49
|- style="background:#fbb;"
| 75
| March 30
| L. A. Clippers
| 
| Karl-Anthony Towns (16)
| Karl-Anthony Towns (11)
| Zach LaVine (4)
| Target Center12,252
| 25–50

|- style="background:#fbb;"
| 76
| April 1
| @ Utah
| 
| Andrew Wiggins (24)
| Karl-Anthony Towns (11)
| Ricky Rubio (9)
| Vivint Smart Home Arena19,911
| 25–51
|- style="background:#fbb;"
| 77
| April 3
| Dallas
| 
| Andrew Wiggins (30)
| Karl-Anthony Towns (21)
| Karl-Anthony Towns (9)
| Target Center16,117
| 25–52
|- style="background:#bfb;"
| 78
| April 5
| @ Golden State
| 
| Shabazz Muhammad (35)
| Karl-Anthony Towns (12)
| Ricky Rubio (9)
| Oracle Arena19,596
| 26–52
|- style="background:#bfb;"
| 79
| April 7
| @ Sacramento
| 
| Nemanja Bjelica (18)
| Gorgui Dieng (13)
| Ricky Rubio (9)
| Sleep Train Arena17,317
| 27–52
|- style="background:#bfb;"
| 80
| April 9
| @ Portland
| 
| Karl-Anthony Towns (27)
| Nemanja Bjelica (10)
| Ricky Rubio (11)
| Moda Center19,733
| 28–52
|- style="background:#fbb;"
| 81
| April 11
| Houston
| 
| Shabazz Muhammad (23)
| Nemanja Bjelica (6)
| Jones, Rubio (5)
| Target Center14,983
| 28–53
|- style="background:#bfb;"
| 82
| April 13
| New Orleans
| 
| Karl-Anthony Towns (24)
| Karl-Anthony Towns (12)
| Ricky Rubio (10)
| Target Center14,889
| 29–53

Transactions

Trades

Free agents

Re-signed

Additions

Subtractions

Notes
That mark was shattered by the 2016-17 Phoenix Suns, who, in addition to holding four rookies between the ages of 18 and 20 to start out the season in Dragan Bender, Marquese Chriss, Tyler Ulis, and the undrafted Derrick Jones Jr., also held a second-year player named Devin Booker that played at the start of the season at age 19.
The team originally played in Buffalo, New York as the Buffalo Braves up to the end of the 1977–78 season and later played in San Diego as the San Diego Clippers between the 1978–79 and 1983–84 seasons inclusive before becoming the Los Angeles Clippers.

References

Minnesota Timberwolves seasons
Minnesota Timberwolves
Minnesota Timberwolves
Minnesota Timberwolves